The 2008 Malaysian Speedcar Series round was the third round of the 2008 Speedcar Series. It was held on 22 and 23 March 2008 at Sepang International Circuit in Sepang, Malaysia. The race supported the 2008 Malaysian Grand Prix.

Classification

Qualifying

Race 1

Race 2

See also 
 2008 Malaysian Grand Prix
 2008 Malaysian GP2 Asia Series round

References

Speedcar Series
Speedcar